The 1991 Rugby World Cup – Africa qualification was a qualifying tournament for the 1991 Rugby World Cup  which was jointly hosted by England, France, Ireland, Scotland and Wales. The Confederation of African Rugby was allocated one place (Africa 1) and a tournament took place in Zimbabwe, which was won by the home team.

Format
In May 1991 four nations played in a round-robin tournament with each nation playing their opponents once and every nation playing three times.

The points system was as follows: 
 3 points for a win
 2 points for a draw
 1 point for playing

All six matches were played at the Police Ground, Harare, Zimbabwe.

Overview
Final standings
{| class="wikitable"
|-
!width=165|Team
!width=40|Played
!width=40|Won
!width=40|Drawn
!width=40|Lost
!width=40|For
!width=40|Against
!width=40|Difference
!width=40|Points
|- bgcolor=#ccffcc align=center
|align=left| 
|3||3||0||0||62||22||+40||9
|- align=center
|align=left| 
|3||2||0||1||41||43||−2||7
|- align=center
|align=left| 
|3||1||0||2||23||36||−13||5
|- align=center
|align=left| 
|3||0||0||3||20||45||−25||3
|}

 qualified to 1991 Rugby World Cup, Pool 2.

References

External links
 Rugbyworldcup.com

1991
Africa
1990 rugby union tournaments for national teams
1990 in African rugby union
Rug
1990 in Moroccan sport
1990 in Tunisian sport
1990 in Zimbabwean sport
International rugby union competitions hosted by Zimbabwe

fr:Qualifications pour la Coupe du monde de rugby à XV 1991
it:Coppa del Mondo di rugby 1991 (Qualificazioni)
ka:რაგბის მსოფლიო ჩემპიონატის კვალიფიკაცია 1991